Zhejiang Professional Football Club, commonly referred to as Zhejiang FC or simply Zhejiang, is a professional Chinese football club that currently participates in the Chinese Super League under license from the Chinese Football Association (CFA). The team is based in Hangzhou, Zhejiang and their home stadium is the Hangzhou Huanglong Stadium that has a seating capacity of 51,971. The club's main investors are the Zhejiang-based Greentown China Holdings Limited company and Zhejiang Energy Group.

The club was founded on January 14, 1998, named as Zhejiang Green Town F.C. and they made their debut in the third tier of China's football league pyramid in the 1999 league season. On November 23, 2000, the club bought the playing right for Chinese Football Association Jia League as well as 32 players from first team of Yanbian Funde F.C.(Then Jilin Aodong) for 25 million Yuan. They have subsequently won promotion to the top tier after finishing runners-up in the 2006 league season and the highest position they have ever finished is third in the 2022 Chinese Super League season. It still remains the top football club in Zhejiang.

History
Zhejiang Green Town Football Club Co., Ltd. was officially established on January 14, 1998, with a capital of 16,000,000 Yuan and Zeng Leming was appointed as their general manager. Greentown Real Estate Company, Hangzhou Qiantang Real Estate Company, Zhejiang University and Zhejiang Provincial Football Association all participated in the creation as well as the registration of the club. The company would go on to form a youth team before finally creating a senior team on January 22, 1999, to take part in the third tier with Bao Yingfu as their first head coach. They wouldn't wait long to show their ambition when they would make the play-offs in 2000 before losing to Tianjin Lifei. Still determined to win promotion the club decided to buy the playing right for Chinese Football Association Jia League as well as 32 players from first team of Yanbian F.C.(Then Jilin Aodong) on November 23, 2000, for 25,000,000 Yuan, in time for the beginning of the 2001 league season. Under the new general manager Shen Qiang the club brought in new sponsors and Gu Mingchang as the new head coach, however during this period the club couldn't win promotion to the top tier and the chairman Song Weiping expressed his disappointment of the team. Song Weiping would soon discover that the reason for his club's disappointing results when it was discovered that several of his players and coaches were taking bribes, with a 6–0 defeat against Changchun Yatai in the 2001 league season being highlighted, which saw the offending participants banned for a year while the club had three months to reform and re-apply for a CFA playing license. This would see the club would go through several management changes as well as a significant ownership shift, which saw Song Weiping's company Greentown China Holdings Limited take a 96% share of the team for 20,000,000 Yuan in 2005 while Zhejiang University held on to 4%.

Under Wang Zheng as their head coach the team would start to generally push for promotion, eventually achieving it at the end of the 2006 league season when they came second in the division. The club often found themselves fighting off relegation and would bring in several managers to alleviate the problem, however this wasn't enough during the 2009 league season and the club found themselves in the relegation zone at the end of the season. Surprisingly the club were allowed to stay within the 2010 CFA Super League after it was discovered that Chengdu Blades and Guangzhou GPC were guilty of match-fixing. After gaining a reprieve from relegation the club went on a spending spree by signing several established Chinese internationals such as Du Wei, Li Yan and Wang Song. The signings seemed to work and the club's results significantly improved throughout the 2010 league campaign, which saw the club achieve their best ever finish of fourth and a chance to play within the AFC Champions League for the first time.
 
This club is known for its outstanding football academy and youth training facilities. However, they were relegated to the China League after getting second-to-last place in the 2016 CFA super League because of their bad performances for the season with only 8 wins in 30 games.

Aimed to take the crown in the football competition of 2017 National Games of China, Hangzhou Greentown adopted a risky youngster-first policy which was more radical than ever. But good wishes were all vain. In 2017, the team struggled near the relegation zone in their first season of China League while the youngsters who formed the Team Zhejiang watched the championship slip away in the final. Young trainer Xu Lei filled in manager Hong Myung-bo's shoes and the team finally ranked 9th in the league. Meanwhile, former player and veteran Jiao Fengbo also returned as the new general manager.

On 14 January 2018, the club changed their name to Zhejiang Greentown F.C. for the 20th anniversary of the club. The same season they reached third place in the China League, one place away from returning to the CFA Super League.

In September 2020, the team changed their name to Zhejiang Energy Greentown F.C., as Zhejiang Energy Group stepped in as one of the major share holders, while Song Weiping officially quit the club.

On 26 February 2021, According to the requirements of non-corporate change of club name by the Chinese Football Association, after several rounds of discussion and reported to the relevant provincial departments and the Chinese Football Association for review and approval, the club's name changed to Zhejiang Professional Football Club.

Name history

Current squad

First team

Reserve team

Out on loan

Notable players 

  John Jairo Trellez (2001–04)
  Anthony Grdic (2001–03)
  Philippe Chanlot (2001)
  Bertin Tomou (2002–03, 2005)
  Orlando Bernades da Silva (2005–06)
  Tico (2006–07)
  Argel Fucks (2007)
  Erivaldo Saraiva (2008–09)
  Ng Wai Chiu (2009–10)
  Luis Ramírez (2010–11)
  Kim Dong-jin (2012–13)
  Fabrício (2012)
  Davy Angan (2013–16)
  Masashi Oguro (2013)
  Anselmo Ramon (2014–17)
  Chen Po-liang (2015–19)
  Matthew Spiranovic (2015–17)
  Imed Louati (2015)
  Tim Cahill (2016)
  Roda Antar (2016)
  Sammir (2016)
  Rafael Martins (2018–20)
  Dino Ndlovu (2018–20)
  Nyasha Mushekwi (2019–)
  Leung Nok Hang (2021–)
  Franko Andrijašević (2021–)
  Matheus Leite Nascimento (2021–2022)
  Lucas (2022–)

Coaching staff 
As of 18 May 2022

Managerial history

 Bao Yingfu (22 Jan 1999 – Dec 1999) (general coach)
 Zhu Haibo (May 1999 – Dec 1999)
 Wu Tingrui (Dec 1999 – Jul 2000)
 Zhang Jingtian (18 Jan 2000 – 2000) (general coach)
 Zhou Chenggui (Jul 2000 – Oct 2000)
 Gu Mingchang (23 Dec 2001 – 7 Jul 2001)
 Wang Changtai (8 Jul 2001 – 21 Jul 2001) (caretaker)
 Goran Kalušević (24 Jul 2001 – 28 Aug 2001)
 Wang Changtai (28 Aug 2001 – 6 Oct 2001) (caretaker)
 Bobby Houghton (Jan 2002 – 21 Jul 2003)
 Li Bing (21 Jul 2003 – Dec 2003)
 Wang Zheng (Dec 2003 – 15 May 2007)
 Zhou Suian (15 May 2007 – Dec 2007)
 Sun Wei (Dec 2007 – 21 Apr 2008)
 Zhou Suian (21 Apr 2008 – 21 Sept 2009)
 Wu Jingui (21Sept 2009 – Nov 2011)
Team Committee (16 Oct 2011 – Nov 2011)
 Takeshi Okada (15 Dec 201 – 5 Nov 2013)
 Yang Ji (6 Nov 2013 – 4 Nov 2014)
 Philippe Troussier (2 Dec 2014 – 1 Jul 2015)
 Yang Ji (1 Jul 2015 – Nov 2015)
 Hong Myung-bo (17 Dec 2015 – 25 May 2017)
 Yang Ji (1 Jul 2015 – Nov 2015)
 Zdravko Zdravkov (25 May 25, 2017 – Nov 2017) (caretaker)
 Sergi Barjuán (26 Nov 2017 – 3 July 2019)
 Zheng Xiong (3 July 2019 – 31 Dec 2020)
 Jordi Vinyals (1 Jan 2021 – )

Grounds

Records 
 Most league points in a season: 74 (China League, season 2021)
 Record victory: 6–0 v Tianjin Lifei (Jia B, 21 April 2001)
 Record defeat: 0–6 v Changchun Yatai (Jia B, 6 October 2001)
 Record attendance: 48,000 v Shanghai Zhongyuan (Jia B, 19 May 2001)
 Most league appearances: Cao Xuan (221)
 Top scorer: Nyasha Mushekwi (43 goals)
 Top league scorer: Nyasha Mushekwi (42 goals)
 Most league goals scored by a player in a season: Nyasha Mushekwi (23 goals, China League, season 2021)

Honours

Major

League

 China League
Runners-up: 2006, 2020
Third: 2005, 2018, 2021

Cup

CFA Cup
Runners-up: 2022
Third: 2002 (shared), 2006 (shared)

Minor / Reserve / Youth 

 CSL Reserve League
 Third: 2014
 CSL Elite League (U19)
 Champion: 2015
 China League Reserve League
 Runners-up: 2017
National Games of China
Champions: 2021 (U20)
Runners-up: 2017 (U20), 2013 (U18)
Third: 2013 (U20)

Results
All-time League rankings

As of the start of 2022 season.
Bought the first team of Jilin Aodong as well as their position in second tier.

Two CSL clubs were involved in match-fixing scandal and relegated to China League, so Hangzhou Greentown could stay at top level.

Failed to achieve promotion in the play-off.

Promotion was achieved via the play-off.

Key

 Pld = Played
 W = Games won
 D = Games drawn
 L = Games lost
 F = Goals for
 A = Goals against
 Pts = Points
 Pos = Final position

 DNQ = Did not qualify
 DNE = Did not enter
 NH = Not Held
 – = Does Not Exist
 R1 = Round 1
 R2 = Round 2
 R3 = Round 3
 R4 = Round 4

 F = Final
 SF = Semi-finals
 QF = Quarter-finals
 R16 = Round of 16
 Group = Group stage
 GS2 = Second Group stage
 QR1 = First Qualifying Round
 QR2 = Second Qualifying Round
 QR3 = Third Qualifying Round

Feeder teams 

 Hangzhou Luyuan (1999–2003) [Youth team of Zhejiang Green Town FC]
 2000, 2001 Chinese Yi League
 Ningbo Huaao (2006) [Youth team of Zhejiang Green Town FC]
 2006 China D2 League
 Wenzhou Provenza (2011) [U19 team of Hangzhou Greentown FC]
 2011 China D2 League

International friendlies
 On 26 July 2009, Manchester United visited the Dragon Stadium and played a friendly against Hangzhou Greentown as part of their pre-season Asian tour. Manchester United won by 8 goals to 2.
 On 16 July 2011, Arsenal visited the Meihu Stadium and played a friendly against Hangzhou Greentown as part of their pre-season Asian tour. The game was drawn 1–1.
 Zhejiang Greentown also played two friendly games at the Mini Estadi in 2017 and 2019, against FC Barcelona B with the Spanish side won 1-0 and 3-1 respectively.

International results

Kit history

Rivals 
Because there are not many football clubs based on Zhejiang in history, Zhejiang FC has rarely been able to have a rival in the province for a long time. In 2017, after being relegated to China League, Hangzhou Greentown briefly had a 2-seasons Zhejiang derby with Zhejiang Yiteng but only won 1 out of 4 matches. More often than not, Zhejiang FC has a stronger rivalry with other teams of the same level in the Wu Chinese region, such as Shanghai Zhongyuan and Shanghai Shenhua.

References

External links
 Club website

 
Football clubs in China
Association football clubs established in 1998
1998 establishments in China
Sport in Hangzhou